Elaine King Fuentes is a financial planner, writer and motivational speaker born in Lima, Perú. She lives in Miami. Fuentes has focused her career in financial education for families. In 2017, King was included in the list of the 25 most powerful Latina women in the United States, published by People magazine, and in 2020, she appeared on Investopedia's Top 100 Financial Advisors list.

Education

King completed post-graduate studies in Family therapy at the Bowen Center for the Study of the Family, Georgetown University. She also has an International Business Degree from St. Mary's University and an International MBA from Thunderbird School of Global Management.

She is a Certified Financial Planner, Florida Supreme Court Family Mediator, Certificate Family Business Advisor (Family Firm Institute)  and Certified Divorce Financial Analyst (Institute of Certified Divorce Financial Analysts). In 2020 she obtained a Financial Education Certification from the National Financial Educators Council.

Career 
From 1996 to 2000, King was Investment Advisory Service Manager at Salomon Smith Barney (Citigroup).

She was Investment Manager of the Royal Bank of Scotland's Coutts (Latin America Division) until 2004; then, she became Director of Gibraltar Private Bank & Trust's Wealth and Well-Being Planning Institute. She worked there until 2011. In 2010 King published her first book, Family & Money Matters – Life lessons for the new generation.

From 2010 to 2012, King served on the Collaborative Family Law Institute Board, and in 2011 was managing director of The Lubitz Financial Group. She won the Tumi USA award in 2011, which recognizes outstanding Peruvian immigrants.

Her second book, Family and Money, Made Easy!, was published in 2012. The book received an International Latino Book Award in the Best Parent / Family Book category. She wrote two books in 2013: Tu plan de vida en Estados Unidos ¡Hecho fácil! and Saltarín, a book that teaches children 4 to 8 years old the importance of planning.

She was Vice President of Bessemer Trust Group during 2012 and 2013. From 2014 to 2016 was Partner and Director of Family Education & Governance at WE Family Offices, providing consulting services for families seeking to address communication and economic issues. In 2016 was member of the Miami Advisory Committee at the Family Firm Institute. King is member of the board of OWIT (Organization of Women in International Trade) South Florida.

In 2017, she was chosen as one of the 25 Most Powerful Women by People en Español. In 2020 she was included in the Top 100 Financial Advisors of the financial education portal Investopedia, which recognizes the 100 most important financial advisors of the year. Two new books by the author will be published in the first half of 2021: Los 10 mandamientos para toda familia empresarial y Saltarín aprende a usar sus monedas.

She speaks at conferences related to family financial planning and financial education.

Community service 
Throughout her career, King has performed community service as:
Ambassador to the CFP Board
Member of the Board of Directors of the Financial Planning Association of Florida
Member of the Board of Directors of the Estate Planning Council of Miami
Member of the Board of Directors of OWIT (Organization of Women in International Trade), South Florida
Member of the Family Business Advisory Committee of the Family Firm Institute
Founder of Family and Money Matters Institute (IFAYDI), based in Peru
Collaborator of CIMA, a shelter for homeless children in Peru.

Bibliography 
 Family & Money Matters – Life lessons for the new generation (Kabraah Publishing, 2010) 
 La Familia y el Dinero ¡Hecho Fácil! (Family and Money, Made Easy!)  (Penguin Worldwide, 2012)
 Tu plan de vida en Estados Unidos ¡Hecho fácil! (Penguin Worldwide, 2013)
 Saltarín y las 4 palabras clave para una familia unida (for children) (Santillana, 2013)
 Los Colores de Tu Dinero: 7 Pasos Para Tu Salud Financiera (RUMI Productions LLC, 2015)
 El secreto de las parejas felices y el dinero (Harper Collins, October 2017)
Los 10 mandamientos para toda familia empresarial (2021)
Saltarín aprende a usar sus monedas (2021)

In the media

Television 
She participated on interviews for CNN (Spanish), ABC, CBS, Univision, Telemundo, Mega TV, NTN24, RPP Noticias, Canal N, Andina de Televisión y Noticias Caracol.

Press 
King has been quoted in The Wall Street Journal, Fox Business, NASDAQ, MarketWatch (Dow Jones & Co.) and Financial Advisor. She also writes regularly for American Student Assistance, the CFP Board of Standard blog, Miami Herald, Gana Más Magazine, El Comercio (Perú), Forbes Magazine, Revista Dinero, Diario Gestion and El Peruano,

She was interviewed as "Mujer del Mes" (Woman of the Month) in Vanidades Magazine, El Comercio, Diario Gestion and La República (Perú).

Awards 

 Latino Book Award 2013 - Best Parenting/Family Book: La Familia y el Dinero ¡Hecho Fácil! 
 Tumi USA Award - Golden Tumi 2011 Community Excellence
 One of the 25 Most Powerful Women by People en Español - 2017
 Included in the Top 100 Financial Advisors in Investopedia - 2020.

References

External links 
 
 ABC Chicago interviews Elaine King at Latino Book and Family Festival
 ABC Money Talks interviews Elaine King: Planning in your 20's

Living people
Financial advisors
Financial planners
American motivational speakers
Women motivational speakers
Year of birth missing (living people)
Peruvian emigrants to the United States